Closeburn may refer to:

 Closeburn, Queensland, a locality in the Moreton Bay Region, Australia
 Closeburn, Dumfries and Galloway, in Scotland
 Closeburn, Queenstown, in New Zealand